William George Butler (born 24 January 1942) is a British radio presenter on Liverpool Live and formerly BBC Radio Merseyside and  Radio City. In the course of his career, he has presented TV shows such as FAX and the magazine programme What the Butler Sees. In September 2010 he published his autobiography Billy Butler MBE – Mrs Butler’s Eldest.

Butler was born in Amlwch, Anglesey in Wales.  In the 1960s he was a DJ at the Cavern Club in Liverpool. He appeared in Scousers in St Helens on 26 October 2010 alongside Tina Malone, Margi Clarke and many others. From 1988 to 1990 he presented a seasonal late Friday night show on BBC Radio 2 in the early months of the year.

During the summer of 1979 he was the co-host of Saturday morning children's TV show The Mersey Pirate, based on the ferry MV Royal Iris. In 1987, Butler appeared in the first two series of ChuckleVision in a segment called "Armchair Theatre", where he would tell a story to the viewers.

In 2018, Butler's contract with BBC Radio Merseyside was not renewed.

Radio City

After several years at Radio City, Billy left when he played Cliff Richard's Can't Keep This Feeling In twice during a breakfast show on sister station Magic 1548 and saying this was what the listeners asked for, but the station playlist would not allow him to play it, so he walked out while live on air.

Hold Your Plums

Hold Your Plums was a radio quiz show which ran for over a decade on BBC Radio Merseyside. It was hosted by Billy Butler and Wally Scott .

Hold Your Plums started out as a segment of Billy Butler’s radio show and was extended to a two-hour show of its own. It was broadcast live from the BBC Radio Merseyside Studio’s on Paradise Street, Liverpool on Sundays from 11am to 1pm, using Root Beer Rag composed by Billy Joel as its regular catchy theme tune. Mostly an audience was present in the studio as the show went out.

References

External links
Billy Butler Interview NAMM Oral History Library (2019)

Living people
People from Amlwch
British radio presenters
BBC people
1942 births
BBC Radio 2 presenters
Radio presenters from Liverpool